BB84 is a quantum key distribution scheme developed by Charles Bennett and Gilles Brassard in 1984. It is the first quantum cryptography protocol. The protocol is provably secure, relying on two conditions: (1) the quantum property that information gain is only possible at the expense of disturbing the signal if the two states one is trying to distinguish are not orthogonal (see no-cloning theorem); and (2) the existence of an authenticated public classical channel. It is usually explained as a method of securely communicating a private key from one party to another for use in one-time pad encryption.

Description 
In the BB84 scheme, Alice wishes to send a private key to Bob. She then encodes these two strings as a tensor product of  qubits:

Together,  give us an index into the following four qubit states:

Note that the bit  is what decides which basis  is encoded in (either in the computational basis or the Hadamard basis). The qubits are now in states that are not mutually orthogonal, and thus it is impossible to distinguish all of them with certainty without knowing .

Alice sends  over a public and authenticated quantum channel  to Bob. Bob receives a state , where  represents both the effects of noise in the channel and eavesdropping by a third party we'll call Eve. After Bob receives the string of qubits, both Bob and Eve have their own states. However, since only Alice knows , it makes it virtually impossible for either Bob or Eve to distinguish the states of the qubits. Also, after Bob has received the qubits, we know that Eve cannot be in possession of a copy of the qubits sent to Bob, by the no-cloning theorem, unless she has made measurements. Her measurements, however, risk disturbing a particular qubit with probability ½ if she guesses the wrong basis.

At this point, Bob announces publicly that he has received Alice's transmission. Alice then knows she can now safely announce , i.e., the bases in which the qubits were prepared.

From the remaining  bits where both Alice and Bob measured in the same basis, Alice randomly chooses  bits and discloses her choices over the public channel. Both Alice and Bob announce these bits publicly and run a check to see whether more than a certain number of them agree. If this check passes, Alice and Bob proceed to use information reconciliation and privacy amplification techniques to create some number of shared secret keys. Otherwise, they cancel and start over.

See also 
 SARG04
 E91 – quantum cryptographic communication protocol

References 

Cryptographic algorithms
Quantum information science
Quantum cryptography
Quantum cryptography protocols

de:Quantenkryptografie#BB84-Protokoll